Vanna Marie White (née Rosich; born February 18, 1957) is an American television personality and game show hostess. She is best known as the co-host of Wheel of Fortune, a position she has held since 1982. She began her career as a model while studying fashion, competing in Miss Georgia USA in 1978. In addition to her work on Wheel of Fortune, she has played minor characters or appeared as herself in many films and television series, and she is the author of the 1987 autobiography Vanna Speaks. White also participates in real estate investment, owns the yarn brand Vanna's Choice, and patronizes St. Jude Children's Research Hospital.

Early life 
Vanna Marie Rosich was born on February 18, 1957, near North Myrtle Beach in Horry County, South Carolina, the daughter of Joan Marie (Nicholas) and Miguel Angel Rosich. Her parents divorced when she was an infant and she was raised by her mother, Joan, and Joan's second husband, Herbert White Jr. (1925–2022), in North Myrtle Beach. White took the surname of her mother's second husband, a former real estate broker. (On April 1, 2022, White announced, to an outpouring of support, that he had died peacefully that morning.)
After graduating from high school, White moved to Atlanta, Georgia, where she attended The Atlanta School of Fashion and Design and worked as a model. She headed to Los Angeles in 1979 to pursue an acting career. She spent the summer of 1980 back in South Carolina with her mother, who was dying of ovarian cancer.

Career

Television, motion picture, and other media appearances 

Before her appearance on TV in 1980, White was a contestant in the Miss Georgia USA 1978 pageant.

White's first appearance in a game show was on the June 20, 1980, episode of The Price Is Right, in which she was among the first four contestants. She did not make it on stage, but the clip of her running to Contestants' Row was rebroadcast as part of The Price Is Right 25th Anniversary Special in August 1996, The Price Is Right Celebrates 50 Years in September 2021 (in which she also appeared as a Guest Model during the show), and also was featured on the special broadcast Game Show Moments Gone Bananas.

In 1980, White acted in a film that was not completed; the film was subsequently edited and released in June 1990 as Gypsy Angels. In 1981, she got a bit part in the film Looker and also appeared as Doris in the horror movie Graduation Day, an American slasher film directed by Herb Freed and produced by Troma Entertainment.

Her 1987 autobiography, Vanna Speaks!, was a best-seller. Also in 1987, she was featured in a Playboy pictorial, showing photos taken of her before her career on Wheel of Fortune, wearing see-through lingerie.

In 1988, she appeared in the NBC television film Goddess of Love, in which she played Venus; Betsy Palmer co-starred as Juno; it scored 12% of the Audience Vote on Rotten Tomatoes.

She has made cameo appearances on television shows such as L.A. Law, 227, Super Mario Bros. Super Show, Simon and Simon, The King of Queens, Full House, RuPaul's Drag Race All Stars and in films such as Naked Gun : The Final Insult (1994) and Double Dragon (1994).

She guest starred on Married...With Children; in a gender-bending parody of the film Indecent Proposal, White had the Robert Redford role while Al Bundy had that of Demi Moore. She served as guest timekeeper and provided interviews from the backstage area throughout the evening for WrestleMania IV. In 1996, she was the main narrator and singer in the CD release of Leslie Bricusse's "Santa's Last Ride".

On April 20, 2006, she was honored with a star on the Hollywood Walk of Fame, with Pat Sajak, Merv Griffin, and Alex Trebek as key witnesses.

White lent her voice to the Canadian animated television special The Real Story of Twinkle, Twinkle Little Star and the American animated television series Captain Planet and the Planeteers.

White presented a set of luggage in a special guest appearance on The Price Is Right Celebrates 50 Years in September 2021.

In May 2022, White appeared as a special guest in the seventh season of RuPaul's Drag Race: All Stars where the contestants did a runway in tribute to her past looks.

Wheel of Fortune television game show 
After Wheel of Fortune hostess Susan Stafford left in October 1982, White was selected as one of three substitute hostesses (along with Vicki McCarty and Summer Bartholomew) to co-host the show. On December 13, 1982, White became the regular hostess.

White temporarily took over hosting Wheel of Fortune as MC starting with the week of episodes which were slated to air starting on December 9, 2019. The announcement was made after a taping day was postponed when Sajak was hospitalized with a blocked intestine and needed emergency surgery in order to clear it. White hosted that taping day and the subsequent rescheduled taping the next day. Guest letter activators were implemented during her shows hosting; the weeks of December 9 and 16 had Mickey Mouse and Minnie Mouse during the Secret Santa Holiday Giveaway.  Subsequently, the show went on hiatus during Christmas week (December 23, 2019) and then a week of previously taped "America's Game" episodes (Wheel tapes six episodes per day, with each studio audience receiving three shows each; the third show in the afternoon session is an "America's Game" episode) that Sajak hosted, before White returned to hosting on January 6, 2020, for a final week; she was assisted by a "special guest", Pat Sajak's daughter Maggie. Fully recovered from his surgery, Sajak returned to the show on December 5, 2019, with episodes to be broadcast beginning on January 13, 2020.

Since 2021, Sajak and White hosted Celebrity Wheel of Fortune on ABC. Later in the year it was announced that both Sajak and White have been signed on to continue as hosts of Wheel of Fortune through the 2023–24 season.

Real estate investing 
White uses her income to invest in apartment buildings, and she likes flipping houses. In 2017, she listed her Beverly Hills home for $47.5 million.

Crochet and knitting endorsements 
When White was five, her grandmother taught her how to crochet. White had lost interest in the hobby over time until, on the Wheel of Fortune set, she noticed her pregnant hairdresser was crocheting a baby blanket for herself. White told her that she previously crocheted and asked the hairdresser to help her relearn crochet. When she has downtime on the set, she often crochets, as she finds it very relaxing and she has something to show for the time she's spent doing it.

White began her relationship with Lion Brand Yarns when she spoke about her love of crochet on The Tonight Show Starring Johnny Carson; the yarn company subsequently contacted her and negotiated a contract. She has her own line of yarn called Vanna's Choice and endorses crochet and knitting books published in her name.

World record 
White is famous for her seamless revealing of letters on the game board, her smile, and her constant clapping in support of each episode's contestants. On the May 24, 2013 episode of Wheel of Fortune, White was presented with a Guinness World Record certificate for most frequent clapper. As of January 31, 2013, it was estimated she had clapped at least 3,480,864 times across the show's 30 seasons. She had appeared in all but 10 of Wheel's 5,754 episodes to that point, during the show's modern syndicated run, which began on September 19, 1983. That works out to an average number of 606 claps per show.

Personal life 
In the 1980s, White dated and became engaged to Playgirl centerfold/Chippendales-dancer-turned-actor John Gibson. However, Gibson was killed in a plane crash in 1986. In 1990, White married restaurant owner George Santo Pietro. She first became pregnant in September 1992. An episode of Wheel of Fortune contained "Vanna's pregnant" as the answer to a puzzle. She miscarried shortly after the episode's taping. White gave birth to a son, Nicholas (Nikko), in 1994 and a daughter, Giovanna (Gigi), in 1997, from her marriage to Santo Pietro. The couple divorced in November 2002. From 2004 to 2006, she was engaged to Southern California businessman Michael Kaye. The two never wed. Since 2012, White has been dating contractor John Donaldson, whom she met through mutual friends.

White is a Baptist Christian.

White is sometimes described as the "niece" of actor Christopher George. While George is not a biological relation, White's mother grew up with him, and George and his wife took White "under their wing" in Los Angeles. Also, in that same conversation, she said that her children come to Wheel of Fortune tapings many times.

Philanthropy 
As of 2019, White has donated $1.8 million to St. Jude Children's Research Hospital and plans to continue her philanthropy after her retirement.

Litigation 
In 1993, White sued Samsung Electronics over its use of an advertisement featuring a robot turning letters on a game show, alleging a violation of her personality rights. The lower court's decision in Samsung's favor was reversed by the United States Court of Appeals for the Ninth Circuit, which denied a rehearing, but Judge Alex Kozinski issued a dissent. The U.S. Supreme Court denied certiorari. A jury ultimately awarded White $403,000 in damages.

Publications

References

External links 

 
 Vanna White's biography on wheeloffortune.com
 Judge Alex Kozinski's dissent in the White v. Samsung Electronics appeal
 

1957 births
20th-century American women
21st-century American women
20th-century Christians
21st-century Christians
American Christians
American women philanthropists
American women television personalities
Contestants on American game shows
Game show models
Living people
People from North Myrtle Beach, South Carolina
Philanthropists from South Carolina
Wheel of Fortune (franchise)
Women who experienced pregnancy loss